Government Degree College Tral (Urdu;) also known as GDC Tral, is a University of Kashmir-affiliated co-educational degree college located at Tral in Pulwama district of the Indian union territory of Jammu and Kashmir. It is a University Grants Commission autonomous college recognised by UGC under 2(f) and 12(b) of UGC Act 1956.

History 

Department of higher education, Govt. of Jammu and Kashmir established the college under the chief-Ministership of Dr. Farooq Abdullah in the year 1988.

Location 
GDC Tral is located in a vast area spread over many acres of land.

Courses offered 
The college offers bachelor degrees in three streams: science, arts and commerce.
 Bachelor of Arts
 Bachelor of Science (Medical)
 Bachelor of Science (Non Medical)
 Bachelor of Commerce

References 

Degree colleges in Kashmir Division
Universities and colleges in Jammu and Kashmir
Colleges affiliated to University of Kashmir
1988 establishments in Jammu and Kashmir
Educational institutions established in 1988